John Britton (18 March 1900 – 8 October 1953) was a Scottish footballer who played as a goalkeeper for Albion Rovers, Dundee, Tottenham Hotspur and Celtic.

Football career
Born in Lennoxtown, Stirlingshire, Britton had spells with Duntocher Hibs, Albion Rovers and Dundee (playing on the losing side in the 1925 Scottish Cup Final) before joining Tottenham Hotspur in March 1926. Britton appeared in 40 Football League matches for the White Hart Lane club, though had to battle with several rivals (including compatriot Jimmy Smith, Joe Nicholls and Cyril Spiers) for a place in the team.

Released by Tottenham following their relegation in 1927–28 he returned to Scotland and ended his senior career at Celtic, though again he was firmly a backup member of the squad behind John Thomson and John Kelly and never made a first team appearance for the Glasgow club. Finally he went back to the junior level with Kirkintilloch Rob Roy.

References

1900 births
Sportspeople from Lennoxtown
Scottish footballers
Association football goalkeepers
English Football League players
Scottish Football League players
Scottish Junior Football Association players
Duntocher Hibernian F.C. players
Kirkintilloch Rob Roy F.C. players
Albion Rovers F.C. players
Dundee F.C. players
Tottenham Hotspur F.C. players
Celtic F.C. players
1953 deaths